Teenage Mutant Ninja Turtles is an ongoing American comic book series published by IDW Publishing. Debuting in August 2011, it was the first new comic version of the Turtles to debut after the sale of the media franchise to Nickelodeon in October 2009. The initial creative team consisted of Turtles co-creator Kevin Eastman (who collaborated on the plot and the page layouts), Tom Waltz (who scripted the series) and artist Dan Duncan.

Publication history 
In April 2011, IDW Publishing acquired the license to publish new collections of older Teenage Mutant Ninja Turtles comics from Nickelodeon, as well as a new ongoing series. The first issue of the new series was released on August 24 that year. Turtles co-creator Kevin Eastman and Tom Waltz wrote the book, with Eastman and Dan Duncan providing art. In 2017, issue #73 of the main ongoing series was published, making it the longest-running comic in the franchise's history, surpassing Archie Comics' Teenage Mutant Ninja Turtles Adventures. In 2019, issue #100 of the comic was published, concluding the eight part "City at War" arc. Starting with issue #101, series writer and artist Sophie Campbell took over as the sole lead writer for the book.

Plot

Volume I (Issues #1-100)
Hamato Yoshi is a member of the Foot Clan led by Oroku Saki during Japan's feudal period. After seeing Saki act ruthlessly, Yoshi leaves the Clan and is marked a traitor, and Saki orders Yoshi's entire family to be put to death. Yoshi's wife, Tang Shen, is attacked and severely wounded, and with her last breath she beseeches Yoshi to protect himself and the children. He flees with the boys and remains on the run for several years. Saki, who will later be known as Shredder, eventually finds Yoshi and his children, and murders them all.

Yoshi and his sons' spirits are reincarnated in modern times as a gray rat and four green turtles in a research laboratory called Stock Gen, owned by Baxter Stockman, a scientist who has secretly allied himself with Krang. An intern at Stock Gen, April O'Neil, names the turtles after Renaissance artists: Leonardo, Michelangelo, Donatello, and Raphael. Members of the Foot Clan break into the facility to steal an alien mutagen. The animals are taken by mistake, and when they and the stolen mutagen get lost in the sewer, they are covered with the spilled mutagen and transformed into enlightened, humanoid beings.

Yoshi, now called Splinter, remembers his past life and begins to train the turtles in the art of ninjutsu. Unfortunately, the seemingly trivial event which led to the creation of the Turtles and Splinter is part of an escalating conflict between several powers trying to take control of the Earth:
 The Foot Clan, with their leader Shredder, who has survived into the modern age due to the machinations of the shape-shifting witch Kitsune;
 The Utrom warlord Krang, who plans to terraform Earth into a new home for the last survivors of his race;
 The zealous government agent John Bishop, leader of the Earth Protection Force, who seeks to eradicate mutantkind and aliens;
 The mysterious Madam Null and her enterprise Null Group, a business conglomerate with its hands in many ventures and ties to other dimensions which deliberately creates mutants as a slave workforce;
 A mysterious Pantheon of immortal demigods, some of whom to subvert humanity to their will, as they once did in bygone times.
Finding new allies as they go, the Turtles are forced to strive against enemies and save the world from total destruction as this many-fold conflict begins to spin out of control.

Volume II (Issues #101-)
With a mutagen bomb attack by Hob on the New York populace during Baxter Stockman's inauguration as the city's new mayor, the world's public is made aware of the existence of mutants. A ghetto called Mutant Town is erected in the heart of Manhattan to quarantine them, with Hob and his Mutanimals exercising loose political control over its inhabitants. The Turtles and their friends unite to make Mutant Town both a better place to live in and a hub of tolerance and communication with the outside world, but new conflicts begin to emerge:
Zom becomes pregnant and gives birth to a daughter, hailing a new era for the Triceratons, but also stirring hostility in the radical Utrom Ch'rell
The Punk Frogs, a street gang of mutant frogs, attack the Turtles and burn the dojo, believing that they took away one of their members, Bonnie
A mad mutant surgeon by the name of Jasper Barlow tries to "improve" on mutantkind
The Rat King, a member of the Pantheon,is eager to see his family's power game brought to a conclusion and attempts to unleash his own twisted version of Armageddon on mankind

Characters
The series reimagines the origins of the Turtles, as well as other characters such as April O'Neil, Splinter, The Shredder, Casey Jones, and Baxter Stockman. Notably, the series, like the original Mirage version, initially gives all four Turtles red eye masks until issue #5, where Splinter gives Leonardo, Donatello and Michelangelo their well-known blue, purple and orange masks, respectively, with Raphael keeping his signature red.

The series features characters and plot devices from throughout the TMNT franchise, including:
 Tang Shen, Karai, the Purple Dragons, the Utroms, the Triceratons, the Rat King, Professor Honeycutt, Leatherhead, the Second Time Around shop, Renet, Savanti Romero, the vigilante Nobody, Klunk, Chet, Kirby and the Warp Crystal, the Pantheon, Louis Braunze and Seri from the Mirage Comics;
 Antoine Puzorelli (here named "Antonio") from the Volume 3 series by Image Comics;
 Dimension X, Krang, Bebop and Rocksteady, Slash, Metalhead, the Technodrome, the Neutrinos, the Stone Soldiers, the Roadkill Rodneys, Mutagen Man, Antrax, Dark Water, Channel 6, Burne Thompson, Vernon Fenwick, Irma Langinstein, the Punk Frogs, Mona Lisa, Don Turtelli and Big Louie, Groundchuck and Dirtbag from the 1987 cartoon series;
 the Mighty Mutanimals, the Warrior Dragon, Null, the Gang of Four, Wyrm, Manmoth, Maligna and the Malignoids, Ace Duck, Cryin' Houn', Stump, Sling, Bob and Carmen, the Nova Posse, Noi Tai Dar, Cherubae and the Turnstone, Cudley the Cowlick, the Path of the Four Winds, Verminator-X, Mazool and Armaggon from the Archie Comics series;
 Ch'rell (alias of the Utrom Shredder), Angel, Hun, Agent Bishop and the Earth Protection Force, Darius Dun, the Street Phantoms, the Dark Turtles, Torbin Zixx, Garbage Man, the Battle Nexus Tournament and the Triceraton invasion of Earth from the 2003 cartoon series;
 Pigeon Pete and the monicker "Hamato Clan" from the 2012 CGI series;
Tokka and Rahzar from the feature films;
Venus De Milo from Ninja Turtles: The Next Mutation;
Fred Hamster and Ferd (by name) from the Palladium Books role-playing game.

It has also introduced new characters, such as:
 Old Hob, a mutated alley cat and former enemy of Master Splinter, now founder and leader of the Mutanimals gang. Stemming from his bitter personal experience with humans, Hob intends to prepare for what he perceives an inevitable war between mutants and humans, eventually resorting to terroristic means to recruit his Mutanimals army.
 Alopex, a mutant polar fox who begins her new life as an assassin of the Foot Clan, but later becomes a friend of the Turtles and Raphael's romantic interest. It is later revealed that she was intended to be a pawn for Kitsune, a role Alopex eventually rebelled against.
 Woody Dirkins, a young pizzeria employee and one of the first human friends of the Turtles. He later develops a crush on Angel after meeting her at the Turtles' Christmas party.
 Harold Lillja, a middle-aged and highly paranoid, but extremely gifted inventor who befriends the Turtle family through Donatello.
 Kitsune, a shape-shifting immortal witch, sister of the Rat King and the youngest member of the Pantheon, who has helped the Shredder through the ages with the intention of making him the new host for the Pantheon's long-lost patriarch, the Dragon, and who seeks the destruction of humanity so that only the Pantheon will remain masters of Earth.
 Takeshi Tatsuo, a samurai from medieval Japan who became the founder of the Foot Clan. Betrayed by his clanspeople for his ruthlessness, but aided by Kitsune, he was reborn in the body of Oroku Saki/the Shredder.
 Oroku Maji and Masato, two chunin of the Foot Clan who brought down Takeshi Tatsuo for his bloodthirsty ways and were later killed by his reincarnation, Maji's son Saki.
 Kid Demon (or just "Kid"), a lesser demon and guardian of Yomi who encounters the Shredder during his journeys into the afterlife.
 Koya and Bludgeon, two loyal mutated henchmen of the Foot Clan: Shredder's pet reconnaissance falcon and a hammerhead shark.
 Toshiro, an elderly mentor of the Foot Clan who is often consulted by Karai for his wisdom and serenity.
 Lindsey Baker, a former aspiring biochemist researcher at Stock Gen, later recruited by Old Hob to create his mutant army. She is also the first TMNT character in an official storyline to be outed as a lesbian.
 Herman, a mutated hermit crab and member of Hob's Mutanimals gang with a soldier's personality and bearing who acts as the Mutanimals' "tank".
 Sally Pride, a mutated lioness and talented vehicle operator, and initially a member of Hob's Mutanimals gang. However, after becoming displeased with Hob's methods, she defects to the Turtles' side and later becomes Mutant Town's first mayor.
 Brooklyn S. Bridge, Angel's father and a former member of the Purple Dragons who now runs a bar named Skara Brae.
 Kara Lewis, a young New York police officer and a friend of Michelangelo and Casey Jones. Because of her personal experiences with mutants, she is made an NYPD liaison to Agent Bishop, but she strongly disapproves of his fanatically hostile attitudes towards all mutants.
 Ma'riell, a moderate-minded Utrom who disapproves of her brother Ch'rell's brutality and loyalty to Krang. After the Utroms' revival on Earth, she becomes their official leader.
 Lieutenant Kleve and Corporal Montuoro, two Utrom military officers and loyal followers of Krang. After Krang is killed by Leatherhead during the conclusion of his war crime trial on Neutrino, they revive Krang's loyal second-in-command, Ch'rell, from his stasis sleep.
 Chi-You, a temperamental member of the Pantheon and the template for the ancient Chinese war deity of the same name.
 Aka, the eldest member of the Pantheon who is amicably neutral in human affairs.
 Jennika, a young Foot Assassin. Initially loyal only to the clan than its leader, she now pledges her service to the Foot's new leader, Splinter and his sons. In time, she begins a relationship with Casey Jones. When she is fatally stabbed by Karai, she is administered Leonardo's mutagen-infused blood in order to speed her healing, but is in the process transformed into a mutant turtle and joins the Ninja Turtles as a fifth member.
 Libby Meitner, an inventor and Harold's former wife and partner, who betrayed him for her own profit and has become the chief engineer for Darius Dun and his Street Phantoms. She has since made up with Harold, but his concern about her welfare has caused Harold to break his ties with the Turtles until Donatello eventually manages to reconcile with him.
 Pepperoni, a baby protoceratops befriended by Raphael. Originally from the Cretaceous period, she met the Turtles during a couple of time-travelling adventures with Renet and accompanied them back to the present day, where she stays as a pet.
 Anchovi, a young velociraptor or deinonychus picked up by the Turtles and Renet during the Bebop & Rocksteady Destroy Everything! storyline, and later Bebop and Rocksteady's companion in the Hit the Road! miniseries.
 Jill Amante, Lindsey's ex-girlfriend and a leading geneticist at Null Industries.
 Zodi, a female scorpion mutant created by Null Industries as a secret operative.
 Doctor Shevlin, the Earth Protection Force's leading technical scientist.
 Maureen Lin, a young New York Police Detective who befriends Michelangelo while looking for her missing brother-in-law, who is revealed to have been killed by Wyrm.
 Toad Baron, a hedonistic member of the Pantheon who strives to be the perfect host for anyone who enters his realm, even against their will.
Alberto, Franz and Bob, the Toad Baron's anthropomorphic frog servants.
 The Dragon: The allfather of the Pantheon, and a child of Brahma, who was entrapped in the netherworld by his sister, The Dreamer. Kitsune seeks to restore him to his "rightful" place on Earth (despite her siblings' opposition) by using Shredder as his host.
 The Dreamer: A daughter of Brahma, the allmother of the Pantheon, and the Dragon's opposite in the aspect of creating and preserving life, whereas the Dragon stands for the destruction of life. She entered sleep and watched humanity through her dreams; when the Dragon perverted them, she imprisoned him in Oroku Saki's soul to neutralize him.
 Gothano, a Cthulhu-esque, soft-voiced member of the Pantheon who wreathes himself in a black robe.
 Ocho: A yokai guardian of the Kira no Ken. She was transformed by Kitsune into a giant anthropomorphic mole, and quartered in the last chamber of the cave where the sword resided. She joins Karai's entourage when she receives the sword.
 Hayashi Natsu: A young woman who was a part of a Japanese Yakuza clan, but has since sworn allegiance to Karai. She is a femalized new version of Tatsu, a character from the 1990 and 1991 live-action films.
 Hakk-R, a cyborg bounty hunter and assassin from Dimension X, hired by Krang to dispose of accusatorial witnesses before his trail.
 Commander Zom, a commanding Triceraton officer and General Zog's love interest, who seeks to establish a home for her people – who were artificially created from Terran triceratops DNA as a slave race for the Utroms – and therefore becomes an inadvertent menace to Earth.
 Krisa, a python mutated to serve the Null Industries.
 The Foot Orphans: A group of pre-adolescent New York children orphaned during the Triceraton invasion who were saved from the Rat King by the Turtles and entrusted with their master Splinter, who was at that time master of the Foot Clan. After Karai's hostile takeover of the Foot, they are evacuated to Dimension X, where they are taken in by the Neutrinos.
 Wayne Bishop, the former founder and director of the Earth Protection Force, and father of its current director, Agent John Bishop. After investigating the Roswell incident, he used the technology and alien (Utrom) DNA recovered from the site to aid his son, a preemie, which left John intellectually fully developed but physically a stunted, dwarfish mutant. Long a retiree, Wayne is killed by his son when Hob attempts to use him as a bargaining chip for Slash's release.
 Special Agent Ravenwood, a member of the Earth Protection Force. She is revealed to be the result of a secret government experiment which split her body into six separate entities with a collective consciousness, and bestowed her with superhuman strength, body elasticity, and longevity. Her state makes her empathize with other mutants, including (at least initially) the miscreants Bebop and Rocksteady.
The Inhabitants of Mutant Town:
 Lita, a small New York child mutated into an albino turtle who is taken in by Clan Hamato. She was named after the rockstar Lita Ford. In an alternate future, she is shown as an orphan after a catastrophic chain of events leads to the break-up of her adopted family, and she was subsequently taken in and trained as a time mistress by Renet and is able to go back in time to rectify this mistake.
Zanna, Zink and Mushroom, three mutant weasel children bred by Hob to serve as merchandise for the Foot Clan in exchange for vital supplies. After escaping their captivity, they are taken in by Clan Hamato.
Sheena, a mutant pig and hard rock singer in Mutant Town, who befriends Jennika through their mutual passion for music and later becomes her girlfriend.
Ivan, a mutant bat and small-time criminal dealer in Mutant Town.
Silas, a mutant muskrat and Jennika's ex-boyfriend from her time before the Foot Clan.
The Road Hogs, a group of mutant pig bikers under the leadership of Tusk.
Jo, a mutant orca who becomes a friend to the Turtles.
Jay, a grim mutant poison dart frog.
The Mutanimal Enforcers, a gang of bullying mutants recruited by Hob to "keep the order" in Mutant Town. Known members include
 Diamond, a mutant porcupine, who was dismissed for acting against Hob's orders;
 Puggle and Bandit, respectively a mutant platypus and raccoon, and a partnered couple;
 Stone, a mutant octopus, and Night, his lemur partner
Antoni Rosetti Junior, the young son of a mafioso who was assassinated by Jennika while she was still human. He was raised by his ambitious mother, who wanted him to ascend as head of his crime family until she was trapped in Mutant Town and later tries to enlist the now-mutated Jennika to train him. Antoni and Jennika become friends, even after Antoni learns about their common past, and after escaping his mother, Jennika gives Antoni into April O'Neil's custody.
Lola Cruz, a reporter who is eager to score a story about life in Mutant Town. Later on, she joins April O'Neil and Mona Lisa in founding Mutant Town's own journalistic team.
Doctor Jasper Barlow, a mutant albino mouse, surgeon and self-declared "scientific researcher" who pursues a twisted idea of "improving" mutants with cybernetic implants or combining body parts into wholly new Frankenstein-like creatures.
Zara Flood, Baxter Stockman's personal secretary and henchwoman
The Null Turtles, a quartet of Ninja Turtle impostors and alternate mutant identities of the Gang of Four under the Rat King's supervision for his Armageddon Game. The "Turtles'" most striking differences from their originals are their use of scarves covering their mouths instead of eye masks, and their use of different weapons.

Comics

Main series
The main ongoing comic started in August 2011 and has released 136 issues .

Micro- and Macro-Series
As per TMNT tradition, four one-shots (officially a mini-series) were released focusing on each turtle, with issue #4 tying into #9 of the main series. Due to the popularity of the series, IDW announced another four issues, focusing on Master Splinter, Casey Jones, April O'Neil and the Fugitoid. Associate Editor, Bobby Curnow, says that if popularity increases, the Micro-Series will become the IDW equivalent of Mirage's Tales of the TMNT.

In April 2013, a new series of eight one-shots was started, under the title Villains Micro-series. The first four issues focus on Krang, Baxter Stockman, Old Hob and Alopex; subsequent issues focused on Karai, Hun, Bebop & Rocksteady and Shredder.

Between October and December 2018, four issues of a "Macro-Series" were published which focused on the Turtles, but featured much longer narrations.

Infestation 2
The Turtles were included in the IDW crossover event Infestation 2. They appeared in one panel in the first issue of the main series. Raphael also appeared on the covers for both issues of the main series; as does Donatello on a variant cover of #1.

The Turtles were also given their own two-part miniseries. A series of strange occurrences leads the Turtles into long forgotten tunnels, where they are forced to confront the Lovecraftian creature Shub-Niggurath and its cult of warped monstrosities.

TMNT Annual 2012
A 48-page black-and-white annual issue was released in October 2012. Its plot focuses on the loss of a valuable peace offering to the Foot Clan from the Savate Ninja syndicate, which inadvertently becomes a catalyst for a vicious gang war that threatens New York City.

Secret History of the Foot Clan
A four-part mini-series, titled Secret History of the Foot Clan, was published from January through March 2013. The series tells the story about the founding of the Foot Clan, and additionally provides clues to the impact the conflict in the past will have on the present.

Utrom Empire
A three-part mini-series, titled Utrom Empire, was started in January 2014. The series focuses on Krang, Professor Honeycutt and Baxter Stockman, as their struggles against each other put the last of the Utrom race into dire peril, as well as including a story about the last days of the titular Utrom empire.

The X-Files: Conspiracy
A one-shot, out-of-continuity issue was published in February 2014 as part of the mini-series crossover event The X-Files: Conspiracy. Guest characters include the Lone Gunmen and the vampire characters from the X-Files episode "Bad Blood".

TMNT Annual 2014
This annual edition features apprentice time mistress Renet and the Battle Nexus Tournament from the Mirage Comics volume 4/TMNT 2K3. Originally slated for April 2014, the release was rescheduled to August due to production difficulties. The Turtles are taken from their home by a dimension-hopping Renet and forced to participate in an interdimensional gladiator contest which by the whim of their initiator, Councilman Nieli, has no winners; but the Turtles, the stubborn Renet and some irritated gladiators intend to change this unbearable condition for the better.

TMNT 30th Anniversary Special
A special edition commemorating the brand's 30th anniversary. Featuring five short stories, one of them entitled "Ready Set Go!" was previously released in Hero Comics 2012; the other four short stories are each set in one of the comic continuities – Mirage, Image, Archie Comics, and IDW – which arose with the franchise.

Turtles in Time
A four-issue mini-series running from June to September 2014. It was a continuation from the story in TMNT Annual 2014. Some intertemporary after-effect from their trip with Renet displaces the Turtles successively into the age of the dinosaurs, medieval Japan, the age of pirates, and even the future; and in each time period they are forced to make decisions which have shaped – and still might shape – their own fate and that of the world around them.

Teenage Mutant Ninja Turtles/Ghostbusters
A four-issue mini-series crossover with IDW's Ghostbusters comic series, celebrating the 30th anniversaries of both franchises. It began publication in October 2014. The story deals with the Turtles and their friends testing a teleportation device whose plans were provided by Professor Honeycutt. Due to a slight mishap during activation, they end up in the Ghostbusters' reality, along with an immortal, hostile creature once known as Chiyou, who seeks domination over mankind.

TMNT: Mutanimals
Another four-issue mini-series dealing with the latest incarnation of the Mighty Mutanimals, published from February to June 2015. Lindsey Baker, Old Hob's human ally and scientific creator of his mutant army, is kidnapped by the security forces of the Null Group, a genetics firm headed by the fiendish Madame Null, who wishes to conquer the world's economy by creating hybrid mutants. As the Mutanimals fight to get Lindsey back, the team – and especially Hob – are forced to seriously reconsider their conduct as mutant liberators.

TMNT: Free Comic Book Day 2015
A story was published as part of the May 2015 Free Comic Book Day. It was a prelude to the Vengeance story arc of the main series (#45–50).

Casey & April
A four-issue mini-series that started publishing in June 2015. Its plot deals with April O'Neil and Casey Jones investigating the contents of a scroll found in the Foot Clan's archives which points out the resting place of a book dealing with a group of immortal entities called the Pantheon, which includes the Rat King and Kitsune in its ranks. During this journey, Casey and April are also forced to do some soul-searching and exploring of their budding relationship.

Batman/Teenage Mutant Ninja Turtles

DC Comics published the six-issue miniseries Batman/Teenage Mutant Ninja Turtles (Feb.–July 2016) It is the second intercompany crossover between IDW and DC Comics, after Star Trek/Green Lantern. The story, out of continuity, deals with the Turtles and their master Splinter, along with Shredder and a good number of his Foot Ninjas, having been interdimensionally displaced by their common enemy Krang; an eviction which landed them in Gotham City in the DC Universe.

Bebop & Rocksteady Destroy Everything!
A weekly five-part miniseries published in June 2016. In this story, Bebop and Rocksteady get their hands on Renet's time scepter and, as the simpletons they are, wreak havoc to all creation as they use the artifact to hop all over time and space, forcing the Turtles and Renet to fix the damage before it becomes irreversible.

TMNT Universe
A spin-off series similar to Mirage's Tales of the Teenage Mutant Ninja Turtles, which started publication on August 31, 2016. It serves as a narrative expansion to the main series with the introduction of crucial sideplots and additional characters. The series ended after 25 issues in August 2018.

TMNT: Free Comic Book Day 2017
A story was published as part of the May 2017 Free Comic Book Day. It was a prelude to the Dimension X story arc of the main series (#73–75).

Teenage Mutant Ninja Turtles/Usagi Yojimbo
A one-shot crossover story re-uniting the Turtles franchise with Stan Sakai's Usagi Yojimbo, which also references Usagi's earlier encounters with the Mirage Turtles. Here, the Turtles must join forces with Miyamoto Usagi and the mystic Kakera against Usagi's sinister enemy Jei und Namazu. This issue was published in July 2017.

Dimension X
A five-issue limited series which started weekly publication on August 2, 2017. Its plot is a tie-in to the main series' "The Trial of Krang" storyline (issues #73–75), dealing with the Turtles and Professor Honeycutt trying to locate several material witnesses for Krang's trial before Krang's hired assassin, Hakk-R, can get to them first.

TMNT Day Sampler
A free sampler comic reviewing the series from issues #1 to #73 and Dimension X, which was distributed on October 25, 2017, by selected comic stores for the occasion of issue #75's publication.

Teenage Mutant Ninja Turtles/Ghostbusters II
In July 2017, IDW announced a sequel series to the 2014–2015 TMNT/Ghostbusters crossover, scheduled for weekly publication starting November 1, 2017. Setting in upon the conclusion of issue #75, the Turtles are stranded in a spirit dimension where they are beset by the vengeful ghost of their late adversary Darius Dun and must get help from the Ghostbusters in order to ever stand a chance of returning home again.

Guest appearances within the story include the Dark Turtles from the 2003 series' Fast Forward season, and Shibano and an alternate version of the Punk Frogs from the 1987 TMNT cartoon series. Additionally, an action figure assortment named Ninja Ghostbusters was issued for sale parallel to the publication of the mini-series; the Ninja Ghostbusters also have a guest appearance within the comic story itself.

Batman/Teenage Mutant Ninja Turtles II

A six-issue sequel series to Batman/Teenage Mutant Ninja Turtles was announced, with the first two issues being planned for release on December 6 and December 20, respectively. The plot deals with Donatello's desire to become a stronger fighter, which drives him into activating an interdimensional doorway to ask Batman for help. Unfortunately, this deed accidentally unleashes Bane on New York City, who loses no time uniting the Foot Clan, which is fractured by internal discord, under his rule. Batman and Robin therefore must travel to the Turtles' reality to aid their mutant friends in bringing down their common foe.

Bebop & Rocksteady Hit the Road
Another weekly five-part miniseries starring Bebop and Rocksteady which entered publication in August 2018, as a follow-up to the Destroy Everything! storyline. Bebop and Rocksteady engage on a two-man roadtrip across the United States, but new and old enemies, as well as a number of hazards lying on the way – including their inexplicable transformation back into their former human forms – begin to pose a collection of serious obstacles for their plans.

TMNT: IDW 20/20
IDW 20/20 is a multiple-issue, 20th-anniversary comic special with plot settings in the main comic franchises published by IDW: Ghostbusters, Jem and The Holograms, My Little Pony, Star Trek, and Teenage Mutant Ninja Turtles. Each issue features a one-shot story set 20 years in the respective franchise's future; in the case of the Turtles, it entails the aftereffect of a civil war between the Utroms which threatens to destroy Earth once again. The TMNT issue was released on January 16, 2019.

Shredder in Hell
Shredder in Hell is a limited five-issue series picking up on The Secret History on the Foot Clan, Villains Micro-Series #8: Shedder, and Teenage Mutant Ninja Turtles #50. As the Shredder wanders the afterlife, companions and enemies of old join him on or try to hinder his journey to find redemption from his cruel, ruthless past in life and his forced destiny to become the Dragon's vessel. The mini-series was released for publication in January 2019.

Batman/Teenage Mutant Ninja Turtles III

The publication of a third and final installment of the successful crossover miniseries was announced on February 15, 2019, for May in the same year. In this series, Krang is presented as the main adversary, and with the most dangerous technology from the DC Universe in his hands, he merges the DC and the TMNT universes into an amalgam reality, where Batman was raised by Splinter alongside the Ninja Turtles following his parents' murder. Escaping from Krang after being abducted along the rest of the original Mirage turtles and Pre-Crisis Batman, Mirage Raphael alerts the Batman and Ninja Turtles of this merged world about Krang's meddling with reality. Now, in order to separate the merged world back, the five heroes need to find their old allies, regain their memories of the original universes, and stop Krang and the Laughing Man (Joker with elements of the Shredder).

TMNT: Casualty of War
A Free Comic Book Day issue (May 2019) connected to the main story issues #93-#95. A secondary story, Road to War, is also included, and is subsequently updated in TMNT: Road to 100 (November 2019).

Mighty Morphin Power Rangers/Teenage Mutant Ninja Turtles
A crossover project between the Power Rangers and Teenage Mutant Ninja Turtles franchises (the second one since Power Rangers in Space) was announced. The series went into publication on December 4, 2019. The non-canon story (in which the Power Rangers universe and the Ninja Turtles continuities of the IDW comics and the 1987 series are merged into one reality) deals with the Power Rangers confronting - and later teaming up with - the Turtles while looking for one of their number, Tommy, who has to everyone's surprise joined the Foot Clan.

TMNT: Jennika
A three-issue miniseries starring the original IDW character Jennika was announced for a 2020 publication in November 2019. In this story, past, present and future collide for Jennika when she is forced to face the ghosts from her former human life and is given a chance to permanently reverse her mutation.

TMNT Annual 2020
Another special annual story was scheduled for publication in June 2020 but delayed until late July due to the COVID-19 pandemic. It deals with the aftermath of The Dragon's defeat during the "City at War" storyline, the Rat King's attempt to find himself a new pawn to carry on his game of eternal intrigue, and an old enemy returning from the dead.

TMNT: The Last Ronin
A limited five-issue story based on an unused idea by Kevin Eastman and Peter Laird for the Mirage comics (hence making it the first IDW title crediting Laird's participation). Originally set for publication in August 2020, it was rescheduled to be released in October. Its plot tells a story set in the future where Michelangelo is the only Ninja Turtle left standing against the Foot Clan following their conquest of New York, and seeks vengeance against their master for his lost family and friends.

TMNT: Jennika II
Due to the popularity of the Jennika mini-series, a sequel limited series with six issues was announced in August 2020 for publication in November of the same year. In the first three parts, Jennika is forced to unite with Ivan in order to discover the source of dangerous, monstrous transformations among the people of Mutant Town while the rest of the world is casting a suspicious eye at their transmutated neighbors. The second half of the series sees Jennika getting entangled in the schemes of a mafioso's widow who - through Jennika's friendship with her young son - intends to use her to re-cement her position in her crime family's hierarchy.

TMNT Annual 2021
In March 2021, the upcoming publication of another annual was announced for June of the same year but was published in late July. Its plot concerns the Rat King's path of decision to end his family's "game" of cosmic intrigue and create his own chaos game, to finally emerge as the ultimate "winner".

TMNT Annual 2022
Another annual was published on March 30, 2022. Its plot revolves around Leonardo's doubts about his capability of leading his brothers while they run into and battle a terrifying new enemy.

TMNT: Free Comic Book Day 2022
Published on April 13, 2022, this story is an updated re-telling of the very first Teenage Mutant Ninja Turtles comic by Mirage Studios, featuring a plot with four faux Ninja Turtles.

The Armageddon Game: Opening Moves
Opening Moves is a two-part miniseries which began publication on July 13, 2022. It serves as a prequel to the Armageddon Game, an upcoming storyline in which the Rat King prepares to unleash his plan of chaos and total anarchy upon the world. Forewarned by an old friend, Shredder and Kitsune embark on a quest to discover the weaknesses of the Rat King's powerful pawns in order to undermine his intentions.

The Armageddon Game and The Armageddon Game: The Alliance
Two interactive miniseries comprising a major story arc which started publication in late September 2022, with Tom Waltz returning as a story writer. The Armageddon Game's plot focuses on the fight of Hamato Clan against the Rat King's insidious game of elimination, which will take the Turtles even across dimensional barriers but will leave the city of New York undefended. So new friends and allies must be found, and all they have learned strained up to the utmost limit, to thwart the mad demigod once and for all.

Mighty Morphin Power Rangers/Teenage Mutant Ninja Turtles II
In the summer of 2022, a sequel series to the IDW/BOOM! Studios' 2019 crossover Mighty Morphin Power Rangers/Teenage Mutant Ninja Turtles was announced for publication in December of the same year. Ryan Parrott is set to return to write the crossover, reuniting with his Go Go Power Rangers! collaborator Dan Mora. In this series, the Power Rangers and Ninja Turtles reunite to combat the combined threat of Krang and Rita Repulsa. But when the two archvillains devise a way to neutralize the Rangers' morphing power, the two teams must resort to alternative ways, a friend turned enemy, and an unlikely ally to regain their edge.

TMNT: Saturday Morning Adventures 
Saturday Morning Adventures is a limited series first announced in late June 2022, which adapts the Fred Wolf cartoon series in four humorous short stories. A sequel series titled Saturday Morning Adventures Continued was announced for a March 2023 publication.

TMNT: The Last Ronin: The Lost Years 
In Summer of 2022, a five-issue prequel/sequel series titled The Last Ronin: The Lost Years was announced by Eastman for publication, with the first issue released January 2023. The series chronicles Michelangelo's training leading up to the events of The Last Ronin, while also showing Casey Marie Jones training her own team of Ninja Turtles. The series is written by Waltz and Eastman, with art by Ben Bishop.

Teenage Mutant Ninja Turtles/Usagi Yojimbo: WhereWhen
In December 2022, the planned publication of a five-issue crossover miniseries between IDW's Teenage Mutant Ninja Turtles and Usagi Yojimbo was announced, as a sequel to the 2017 crossover. The plot deals with the pursuit of the Turtles of a dangerous cyborg named Dr. WhereWhen, who flees into Miyamoto Usagi's reality to establish his own cybernetic empire. The series is set to be published on March 2023.

Teenage Mutant Ninja Turtles Vs. Street Fighter
On February 16, 2023 IDW announced the publication of another comic crossover miniseries for May in the same year, this time combining the Teenage Mutant Ninja Turtles and Street Fighter franchises. Paul Allor (story), Ariel Medel (art) and Sarah Myer (colors) have been named as participants in the project, which is set for five issues. Its plot details a prestigious martial arts tournament in Atlantic City which the Turtles decide to attend to test their skills against the world's best of the best. But amidst the event, several participants suddenly disappear, and the Turtles must team up with their competitors to discover the reason behind this uncanny occurrence.

Chronological comic order
This is a chronological listing of the in-continuity comics in which the timeline of events developed.

{{columns-list|colwidth=22em|
1–4. Teenage Mutant Ninja Turtles #1–4
5. A Lot to Learn (30th Anniversary Special)
6. Teenage Mutant Ninja Turtles #5
7. Micro Series – Raphael
8. Micro Series – Michelangelo
9. Teenage Mutant Ninja Turtles #6
10. Micro Series – Donatello
11–12. Infestation 2: Teenage Mutant Ninja Turtles #1–2
13–14. Teenage Mutant Ninja Turtles #7–8
15. Micro Series – Leonardo
16–17. Teenage Mutant Ninja Turtles #9–10
18. Micro Series – Splinter
19–20. Teenage Mutant Ninja Turtles #11–12
21. Micro Series – Casey Jones
22–23. Teenage Mutant Ninja Turtles #13–14
24. Annual 2012
25. Micro Series – April
26–27. Teenage Mutant Ninja Turtles #15–16
28. Micro Series – Fugitoid
29–32. Teenage Mutant Ninja Turtles #17–20
33. Villains Micro Series – Krang
34. Villains Micro Series – Baxter Stockman
35–38. Secret History of the Foot Clan #1–4
39–40. Teenage Mutant Ninja Turtles #21–22
41. Villains Micro Series – Old Hob
42–43. Teenage Mutant Ninja Turtles #23–24
44. Villains Micro Series – Alopex
45. Villains Micro Series – Karai
46. Teenage Mutant Ninja Turtles #25
47. Villains Micro Series – Hun
48. Teenage Mutant Ninja Turtles #26
49. Villains Micro Series – Bebop & Rocksteady
50–51. Teenage Mutant Ninja Turtles #27–28
52. Villains Micro Series – The Shredder
53. Teenage Mutant Ninja Turtles #29
54. Utrom Empire #1
55. Teenage Mutant Ninja Turtles #30
56. Utrom Empire #2
57–58. Teenage Mutant Ninja Turtles #31–32
59. Utrom Empire #3
60. Annual 2014
61–65. Teenage Mutant Ninja Turtles #33–37
66–69. Turtles in Time #1–4
70–72. Teenage Mutant Ninja Turtles #38–40
73–76. TMNT/Ghostbusters #1–4
77–80. Teenage Mutant Ninja Turtles #41–44
81–84. Mutanimals #1–4
85–86. Teenage Mutant Ninja Turtles #45–46
87. FCBD 2015 – Prelude to Vengeance
88–91. Teenage Mutant Ninja Turtles #47–50
92–95. Casey & April #1–4
96–109. Teenage Mutant Ninja Turtles #51–64
110–114. Bebop & Rocksteady Destroy Everything #1–5
115–118. TMNT Universe #1–4
119. Teenage Mutant Ninja Turtles #65
120–121. TMNT Universe #5–6
122. Teenage Mutant Ninja Turtles #66
123–124. TMNT Universe #7–8
125–128. Teenage Mutant Ninja Turtles #67–70
129–130. TMNT Universe #9–10
131–132. Teenage Mutant Ninja Turtles #71–72
133. Teenage Mutant Ninja Turtles/Usagi Yojimbo
134–138. TMNT Universe #11–15
139–140. TMNT Universe #19–20
141. FCBD 2017 – Prelude to Dimension X
142. Teenage Mutant Ninja Turtles #73
143–147. Dimension X #1–5
148–149. Teenage Mutant Ninja Turtles #74–75
150–154. Teenage Mutant Ninja Turtles/Ghostbusters II #1–5
155–156. TMNT Universe #16–17
157–158. Teenage Mutant Ninja Turtles #76–77
159. TMNT Universe #18
160–162. Teenage Mutant Ninja Turtles #78–80
163–164. TMNT Universe #21–22
165–168. Teenage Mutant Ninja Turtles #81–84
169. Macro Series – Donatello
170. Macro Series – Michelangelo
171–172. TMNT Universe #23–24
173. Teenage Mutant Ninja Turtles #85
174. TMNT Universe #25
175–177. Teenage Mutant Ninja Turtles #86–88
178–182. Bebop & Rocksteady Hit the Road #1–5
183. Macro Series – Leonardo
184. Teenage Mutant Ninja Turtles #89
185. Macro Series – Raphael
186–189. Teenage Mutant Ninja Turtles #90–93
190. FCBD 2019 – "Casualty of War"
191–196. Teenage Mutant Ninja Turtles #94–99
197–201. Shredder in Hell #1–5
202-203. Teenage Mutant Ninja Turtles #100-101
204. Annual 2020
205–208. Teenage Mutant Ninja Turtles #102–105
209–211. Jennika #1–3
212–218. Teenage Mutant Ninja Turtles #106–112
219–221. Jennika II #1–3
222–226. Teenage Mutant Ninja Turtles #113–117227–229. Jennika II #4–6
230–236. Teenage Mutant Ninja Turtles #118–124
237. Annual 2021
238-243. Teenage Mutant Ninja Turtles #125–130
244. FCBD 2022
245-246. Armageddon Game Opening Moves #1-2
247-248. Teenage Mutant Ninja Turtles #131-132
249. Annual 2022
250. The Armageddon Game #1
251. Teenage Mutant Ninja Turtles #133
252. The Armageddon Game #2
253. The Armageddon Game - The Alliance #1
254. Teenage Mutant Ninja Turtles #134
255. The Armageddon Game #3
256. The Armageddon Game - The Alliance #2
257. Teenage Mutant Ninja Turtles #135
258. The Armageddon Game #4
259. The Armageddon Game - The Alliance #3
260. Teenage Mutant Ninja Turtles #136
261. The Armageddon Game #5
262. The Armageddon Game - The Alliance #4
263. Teenage Mutant Ninja Turtles #137
264. The Armageddon Game #6
265. The Armageddon Game - The Alliance #5
266. Teenage Mutant Ninja Turtles #138
267. The Armageddon Game #7
268. The Armageddon Game - The Alliance #6
269. Teenage Mutant Ninja Turtles #139
270. The Armageddon Game #8
}}

Collected editions
The IDW series has been compiled into the following collections which feature micros spliced into story in reading order. Initially they were released exclusively in deluxe hardcover format, but as of March 2021, they are confirmed to be planned for release in paperback format starting in November 2021.

The various series have been collected in the following trade paperbacks:

Other TMNT publications by IDW

Graphic novels
Collections of the original Mirage comics series:
 Teenage Mutant Ninja Turtles Compendium, Vol. 1, collecting Mirage Studios' Vol. 1 #1–7 and 9–14; the Raphael, Michelangelo, Donatello, and Leonardo Micro-Series one-shots; Fugitoid #1; and Tales of TMNT #1–5 (October 2022)
 Teenage Mutant Ninja Turtles Compendium, Vol. 2, collecting Mirage Studios' Vol. 1 #15–23, #27–29, and #31–37 of the ongoing series plus Tales of the TMNT #6 and 7, and the short story “The Ring.” (September 2023)
 Teenage Mutant Ninja Turtles: The Ultimate Collection Vol. 1, collecting Mirage Studios' Vol. 1 issues #1–7, and Raphael #1 (December 2011)
 Teenage Mutant Ninja Turtles: The Ultimate Collection Vol. 2, collecting Mirage Studios' Vol. 1 issues #8–11, along with the Michaelangelo, Leonardo, and Donatello "micro-series" one-shots (April 2012)
 Teenage Mutant Ninja Turtles: The Ultimate Collection Vol. 3, collecting Mirage Studios' Vol. 1 issues #12, 14, 15, 17, and 19–21 (August 2012)
 Teenage Mutant Ninja Turtles: The Ultimate Collection Vol. 4, collecting Mirage Studios' Vol. 1 issues #48–55 (April 2013)
 Teenage Mutant Ninja Turtles: The Ultimate Collection Vol. 5, collecting Mirage Studios' Vol. 1 issues #56–62 (October 2013)
 Teenage Mutant Ninja Turtles: The Ultimate Collection Vol. 6, collecting short stories from 1985-1989 (March 2022)
 Teenage Mutant Ninja Turtles: The Ultimate Collection Vol. 7, collecting covers and developmental art from the Mirage series (March 2023)
 Teenage Mutant Ninja Turtles Classics Vol. 1, collecting colorized versions of Mirage Studios' Vol. 1 issue #13 along with a collection of stories from the Shell Shock TP; "Bottoming Out", "New York Ninja", "Word Warriors", "49th Street Stompers", "Junkman", "O Deed", "Road Trip", "Don't Judge a Book", "A Splinter in the Eye of God?", "Night Life", and "Meanwhile... 1,000,000 B.C.". (June 2012)
 Teenage Mutant Ninja Turtles Classics Vol. 2, collecting colorized versions of Mirage Studios' Vol. 1 issues #16, 22, and 23 (August 2012)
 Teenage Mutant Ninja Turtles Classics Vol. 3, collecting colorized versions of Mirage Studios' Vol. 1 issues #27–29 (December 2012)
 Teenage Mutant Ninja Turtles Classics Vol. 4, collecting colorized versions of Mirage Studios' Vol. 1 issues #32, 33, and 37 along with "The Ring" (from Turtle Soup Vol. 2 Book One) (March 2013)
 Teenage Mutant Ninja Turtles Classics Vol. 5, collecting colorized versions of Mirage Studios' Vol. 1 issues #34 and #38–40 (May 2013)
 Teenage Mutant Ninja Turtles Classics Vol. 6, collecting colorized versions of Mirage Studios' Vol. 1 issues #42–44 (August 2013)
 Teenage Mutant Ninja Turtles Classics Vol. 7, collecting colorized versions of Mirage Studios' Vol. 1 issues #45–47 and six short stories from Shell Shock: "Ghouls Night Out," "Crazy Man," "The Survival Game," "The Howl," "Technofear," and "It's A Gas" (November 2013)
 Teenage Mutant Ninja Turtles Classics Vol. 8, collecting Mirage Studios' Vol. 2 issues #1–5 (May 2014)
 Teenage Mutant Ninja Turtles Classics Vol. 9, collecting Mirage Studios' Vol. 2 issues #6–9 (December 2014)
 Teenage Mutant Ninja Turtles Classics Vol. 10, collecting Mirage Studios' Vol. 2 issues #10–13 (April 2015)
 Tales of the Teenage Mutant Ninja Turtles Vol. 1, Tales of the TMNT Volume I #1–4 + Extras (December 2012)
 Tales of the Teenage Mutant Ninja Turtles Vol. 2, Tales of the TMNT Volume I #5–7 (April 2013)
 Tales of the Teenage Mutant Ninja Turtles Vol. 3, Tales of the TMNT Volume II #1–4 (October 2013)
 Tales of the Teenage Mutant Ninja Turtles Vol. 4, Tales of the TMNT Volume II #5–8 (May 2014)
 Tales of the Teenage Mutant Ninja Turtles Vol. 5, Tales of the TMNT Volume II #9–12 (August 2014)
 Tales of the Teenage Mutant Ninja Turtles Vol. 6, Tales of the TMNT Volume II #13–16 (November 2014)
 Tales of the Teenage Mutant Ninja Turtles Vol. 7, Tales of the TMNT Volume II #17–20 (August 2015)
 Tales of the Teenage Mutant Ninja Turtles Vol. 8, Tales of the TMNT Volume II #21-25 (April 2016)
 Teenage Mutant Ninja Turtles: The Works, Volume 1, collecting colorized versions of Mirage Studios' Vol. 1 issues #1–7, and Raphael #1 (May 2013)
 Teenage Mutant Ninja Turtles: The Works, Volume 2, collecting colorized versions of Mirage Studios' Vol. 1 issues #8–11, Michaelangelo #1, Donatello #1, and Leonardo #1 (October 2013)
 Teenage Mutant Ninja Turtles: The Works, Volume 3, collecting colorized versions of Mirage Studios' Vol. 1 issues #12, #14–15, #17, and #19–21  (September 2014)
 Teenage Mutant Ninja Turtles: The Works, Volume 4, collecting colorized versions of Mirage Studios' Vol. 1 issues #48-#55  (December 2015)
 Teenage Mutant Ninja Turtles: The Works, Volume 5, collecting colorized versions of Mirage Studios' Vol. 1 issues #56-#62 (August 2016)
 Teenage Mutant Ninja Turtles Legends: Soul's Winter, collecting colorized versions of Mirage Studios' Vol. 1 issues #31, 35, 36 (December 2014)

Collections of the Teenage Mutant Ninja Turtles Adventures originally published by Archie Comics:
 Teenage Mutant Ninja Turtles Adventures Vol. 1 (August 2012)
 Teenage Mutant Ninja Turtles Adventures Vol. 2 (October 2012)
 Teenage Mutant Ninja Turtles Adventures Vol. 3 (January 2013)
 Teenage Mutant Ninja Turtles Adventures Vol. 4 (March 2013)
 Teenage Mutant Ninja Turtles Adventures Vol. 5 (July 2013)
 Teenage Mutant Ninja Turtles Adventures Vol. 6 (December 2013)
 Teenage Mutant Ninja Turtles Adventures Vol. 7 (May 2014)
 Teenage Mutant Ninja Turtles Adventures Vol. 8 (September 2014)
 Teenage Mutant Ninja Turtles Adventures Vol. 9 (January 2015)
 Teenage Mutant Ninja Turtles Adventures Vol. 10 (October 2015)
 Teenage Mutant Ninja Turtles Adventures Vol. 11 (March 2016)
 Teenage Mutant Ninja Turtles Adventures Vol. 12 (September 2016)
 Teenage Mutant Ninja Turtles Adventures Vol. 13 (May 2017)
 Teenage Mutant Ninja Turtles Adventures Vol. 14 (November 2017)
 Teenage Mutant Ninja Turtles Adventures Vol. 15 (July 2018)
 Teenage Mutant Ninja Turtles Adventures Vol. 16 (December 2018)

Comics
 Teenage Mutant Ninja Turtles: 100-Page Spectacular (April 2012) – Collects the 3-issue miniseries that preceded the Teenage Mutant Ninja Turtles Adventures ongoing.
 Teenage Mutant Ninja Turtles Color Classics (begun May 2012) – This series reprints issues 1–11 of TMNT Vol. 1 by Eastman and Laird (excepting issue #8 due to guest character copyright) and the four Micro-Series issues in full color with coloring by Tom Smith.
 Teenage Mutant Ninja Turtles Urban Legends (begun May 2018) – Reprints in full color TMNT Volume 3 issues 1–23 originally published by Image Comics. As the series ended abruptly without a narrative conclusion, IDW commissioned original Volume 3 writer Gary Carlson and artist Frank Fosco to produce concluding issues 24–26. Later collected in two tradepaperback volumes.
 Teenage Mutant Ninja Turtles Saturday Morning Adventures'' (begun October 2022) – a 4 issue mini-series based on the original 1987 animated television series, written by Erik Burnham and illustrated by Tim Patrick Lattie.

References

External links
 

2011 comics debuts
IDW Publishing titles
IDW
Reboot comics
Comic book reboots
LGBT-related comics